This list of mountains and hills in the Palatine Forest contains a selection of the highest or more notable peaks located in the natural region of the Palatine Forest in the German state of Rhineland-Palatinate (maximum ).

The mountain range is formed from a slab of Bunter sandstone, about 500 metres thick, that is characterized by a complex relief with deeply incised V-shaped valleys, many different hill shapes and dense forests. In the central Palatine Forest is the plateau of Frankenweide, in which several more mountains are located that also exceed the 600 metre mark. Considerably more varied are the hills of the southern Palatine Forest, a region also known as the Wasgau which, as a unified natural region, crosses the border and runs as far as the Col de Saverne. They often exhibit bizarre rock formations, that in many cases have been used for the construction and location of rock and hill castles.

Because not all the mountains and hills of the Palatine Forest can be included in this list, a number of criteria have been used to make the selection. Of prime importance have been their geomorphological (e. g. rock, relief etc.), biological (e. g. flora like forest coverage and contiguity), cultural historic (e. g. castles, former cultic sites), touristic (e. g. observation towers, Palatine Forest Club huts etc.) and infrastructural features (e. g. transport routes, industrial usage etc.).

Table 
Entries in the table are sorted by height in metres above sea level (NHN). However, the table may also be sorted by the data in columns 1 to 5 by clicking the symbol at the head of the wanted column. In the "Name" column, alternative names for the mountains and hills are given in brackets, in small, italic font. Names that recur are disambiguated by place names in brackets and small font.

The abbreviations used in the table are explained below.

Abbreviations 
Meanings of the abbreviations found in the table:
 NHN = Normalhöhennull i.e. the sea level datum used in Germany
 PWV = Palatine Forest Club (Palatine Forest Club)

See also 
List of mountains and hills of Rhineland-Palatinate

Literature 
 Michael Geiger et al.(ed.): Der Pfälzerwald, Porträt of a Landschaft. Verlag Pfälzische Landeskunde, Landau/Pf., 1987. 
 Michael Geiger et al. (ed.): Geographie der Pfalz. Verlag Pfälzische Landeskunde, Landau/Pf., 2010. 
 Adolf Hanle: Meyers Naturführer, Pfälzerwald und Weinstraße. Bibliographisches Institut, Mannheim, 1990. pp. 7–12 
 Karl Heinz: Pfalz: mit Weinstraße; Landschaft, Geschichte, Kultur, Kunst, Volkstum. Glock und Lutz Verlag, Heroldsberg, 1976. ASIN: B002GZ8RN
 Emil Heuser: Neuer Pfalzführer, 14th edn., (1st edn., 1900). Waldkirch-Verlag, Ludwigshafen, 1979. ASIN: B0043G3V6M
 Landesamt für Vermessung and Geobasisinformation Rheinland-Pfalz (publ.): 1:25.000 and 1:50.000 map series.''Eigenverlag der Landesamtes für Vermessung und Geobasisinformation Rheinland-Pfalz, Koblenz, various years

External links 

 Landesamt für Vermessung and Geobasisinformation Rheinland-Pfalz
 Naturpark Palatine Forest (Hrsg): Pflege- and Entwicklungsplan. Lambrecht 2002 (pdf; 818 kB)
 Palatine rambling portal

References 

Palatine Forest
Palatine Forest